Henley Business School, Africa (formerly Henley Management College, South Africa), in the Paulshof suburb of Johannesburg, is a campus of the British-based Henley Business School, one of the oldest business schools in Europe with operations in 17 countries across the globe. The African institution shares international accreditation with its parent and is also locally accredited in South Africa.  The South African campus has offered the MBA in South Africa since 1992.  In 2002, the South African location became a fully owned subsidiary of the British parent. As the operation in South Africa is the only Henley Business School in the African continent, it has students living in neighbouring countries studying and being supported through this office.

History and growth in Africa
In 1992 Henley Business School introduced its MBA to the South African market, under license to the Graduate Institute of Management Technology (GIMT) and the first 18 MBA students graduated in 1995. When GIMT was sold, Henley UK bought back the license, became a branch office and, in 2002, launched itself as a fully integrated school of Henley in South Africa. In 2008 Henley Management College merged with the University of Reading to form Henley Business School, one of the world’s largest full-service business schools.

In 2007, Henley established its social entrepreneurship arm. This was followed in 2011 by the introduction of Henley MBAid, an initiative whereby students, as part of their learning, provide expertise and support to NGOs.

In 2012, Henley Business School Africa celebrated its 20th anniversary and the opening of its current premises in Paulshof, Sandton.

Academics
Henley Africa’s flagship programme is the internationally recognised Henley MBA, which targets experienced, practising managers seeking to enhance their leadership skills or prepare for a senior management position. The MBA is presented in South Africa as a flexible, family friendly, thirty-month, part-time programme, delivered through a blend of face-to-face workshops, peer group learning, team activities, on-line and off-line individual and group self-study methods. The school has also added the MBA for Music and Creative Industries specifically for artists ad creatives who want to develop their business skills. The programme attracts students from many African countries, including Zimbabwe, Nigeria, Kenya, Mozambique and Ghana.

The school offers a range of executive education programmes. Its open executive development programmes, designed for individuals, span the major management related areas essential for running sustainable organisations and range in length from 2 days to 3 weeks. Programmes include:
Post Graduate Diploma in Management Practice (PG Dip)
Accredited Managers' Programme (AMP) - NGF 6
Managers’ Accelerated Progression (MAP+) Programme
ICE+ Programme – The business management course for creative minds 
Henley Professional Certificate in Coaching (PCIC)
Financial Skills for Management (Finance for Non-Financial Managers)

In addition, Henley consults with a range of leading global organisations to provide customised executive and tailored qualification programmes.

Specialist Centres
The Henley Real Estate Centre Africa is an extension of the School of Real Estate & Planning [LINK TO WIKI PAGE]. Established in 1964, the School of Real Estate & Planning forms an integral part of Henley Business School UK and is the largest school of its kind in the UK.

The centre's chief purpose is to fill the gap in an industry that is sorely lacking in skills on the continent. It aims to help with the development of skills, knowledge and practices for commercially effective, environmentally aware and socially responsible development and management of the real estate industry in Africa.

MBAid
MBAid is a learning initiative between NGOs and Henley Business School Africa. The rationale behind its establishment is that as funding has begun to dry up, NGOs have had to rely increasingly on their ability to fund themselves to survive. One of the principal ideas behind MBAid is to give the NGO a fresh perspective, by bringing in a group of people (students) who are unattached to the outcomes of the NGO. They bring in different insights and perspectives and engage with NGOs in such a way that there is a transfer of skills so that, ultimately, the NGO can become self-sustaining.

Accreditation
Henley is the only international business school in Africa accredited by all three major international accreditation bodies: the European Foundation for Management Development which awards the European Quality Improvement System (Equis), the Association to Advance Collegiate Schools of Business (AACSB) and the Association of MBAs (AMBA). It is also the only international business school accredited by the South African Council on Higher Education (CHE), which is responsible for quality assurance and promotion through the Higher Education Quality Committee (HEQC).

Rankings
The Economist Which MBA? World Rankings 2012: 42nd in the world, and 12th in Europe. Ranked number 1 in two categories: Potential to Network and Student Quality.
Financial Times EMBA Rankings 2012: 53rd in the world, 20th in Europe and 6th place in the UK for its Executive MBA. In terms of long-term salary improvement following completion of the EMBA, Henley remains in the top 20.
Financial Times Business School Rankings:
Consolidated: 2012, 29; 2011, 33; 2010, 58
EMBA: 2012, 20; 2011,	22
Customised programmes: 2011, 20 
Open Executive Education: 2011, 18

Campus & facilities
Henley Business School Africa is located in the Sandton suburb of Paulshof, close to the N1 Western Bypass and 10 km from Sandton City. It provides a variety of facilities for workshops, learning events, coaching sessions, conferences, board meetings, strategy sessions, team meetings, courses and seminars. It is equidistant from Lanseria and OR Tambo international airports.

See also
League tables of South African business schools

References

External links 
Official Site

Business schools in South Africa